A Love So Beautiful is a South Korean streaming television series based on the 2017 Chinese series of the same name, which is based on novel To Our Pure Little Beauty by Zhao Qianqian, which aired on Tencent Video. The series, starring Kim Yo-han, So Joo-yeon, Yeo Hoe-hyun, Jo Hye-joo and Jeong Jin-hwan, is directed by Seo Min-jeong and written by Choi Yoo-jeong and Jang Yu-yeon.

The plot of this coming-of-age drama revolves around the life of three high school students and their friends from youth to adulthood. It premiered on KakaoTV on December 28, 2020, and aired new episodes every Monday, Thursday, and Saturday at 17:00 (KST). It is available worldwide for streaming on Netflix.

The web series aired its last episode on February 20, 2021, garnering 37.3 million cumulative views over its run of 24 episodes.

Synopsis
The series is a story of five high school friends and their journey through high school to adulthood. Seventeen-year-old Shin Sol-i (So Joo-yeon) is a cheerful female student from Chun Ji High School. She has a crush on her fellow student and neighbor Cha Heon (Kim Yo-han). She repeatedly confesses her love to Cha Heon, who appears distant, but is in fact awkward when it comes to expressing his feelings. Woo Dae-seong (Yeo Hoe-hyun), a national swimmer, transfers to Chun Ji High School and falls in love with Shin Sol-i.

Cast

Main
 Kim Yo-han as Cha Heon, an awkward, quiet teenage boy with a warm heart 
 So Joo-yeon as Shin Sol-i, a bubbly high school student who has a crush on her neighbor, Cha Heon
 Yeo Hoe-hyun as Woo Dae-seong, a transfer student and good swimmer who falls in love with Sol-i
 Jo Hye-joo as Kang Ha-young, Shin Sol-i's best friend, Jeong Jin-hwan's crush, his future wife
 Jeong Jin-hwan as Jeong Jin-hwan, Shin Sol-i's best friend, Kang Ha-yeong's husband

Supporting
 Yang Yoo-jin as Seo Ji-soo, Cha Heon's fellow doctor
 Jo Ryeon as Lee Chan-hee, Sol-i's mother
 Yun Seo-hyun as Shin Gi-heon, Sol-i's father
 Seong Hye-min as Moon Sook-hee, the homeroom teacher
 Kim Dong-kyu as Wang Se-hyung, the class' atmosphere maker
 Ji Hwa-seop as Nurse Lee
 Park Ji-won as Oh Hee-ji
 Yoo Ji-yeon as Lee Su-jin
 Ki Eun-yoo as Cha Geon
 Choi Bo-min as Na Mi-nyeo
 Kim Sung-gon
 Kim I-on as Yoo-jin

Episodes

Production

Development
On July 1, 2020, Kakao M announced it would broadcast a remake of the 2017 Chinese series A Love So Beautiful in the form of a miniseries which was in the early stages of production. Produced by WhyNot Media, it is scheduled to air for 24 episodes of 20 minutes each.

Casting
On July 6, 2020 it was reported that Kim Yo-han and So Joo-yeon were considering appearing in the series. On July 27, Kakao M confirmed that So Joo-yeon, Kim Yo-han and Yeo Hoe-hyun were cast in lead roles. In August, Jo Hye-joo joined the cast of the series as the protagonist's best friend.

Promotion
In December 2020, a preview video was released by Kakao M along with character sketches.

Original soundtrack

Part 1

Part 2

Part 3

References

External links
 

 
 A Love So Beautiful at Daum

KakaoTV original programming
South Korean web series
South Korean romance television series
2020 web series debuts
South Korean romantic comedy television series
Television shows based on Chinese novels
South Korean high school television series
South Korean teen dramas
Television series about teenagers
2021 web series endings
Korean-language Netflix exclusive international distribution programming
South Korean television series based on non-South Korean television series